In computer science, an escape sequence is a combination of characters that has a meaning other than the literal characters contained therein; it is marked by one or more preceding (and possibly terminating) characters.

Examples
 In C and many derivative programming languages, a string escape sequence is a series of two or more characters, starting with a backslash \.
 Note that in C a backslash immediately followed by a newline does not constitute an escape sequence, but splices physical source lines into logical ones in the second translation phase, whereas string escape sequences are converted in the fifth translation phase.
 To represent the backslash character itself, \\ can be used, whereby the first backslash indicates an escape and the second specifies that a backslash is being escaped.
 A character may be escaped in multiple different ways. Assuming ASCII encoding, the escape sequences \x5c (hexadecimal), \\, \134 (octal) and \x5C all encode the same character: the backslash \.
 For devices that respond to ANSI escape sequences, the combination of three or more characters beginning with the ASCII "escape" character (decimal character code 27) followed by the left-bracket character [ (decimal character code 91) defines an escape sequence.

Control sequences
When directed this series of characters is used to change the state of computers and their attached peripheral devices, rather than to be displayed or printed as regular data bytes would be, these are also known as control sequences, reflecting their use in device control, beginning with the Control Sequence Initiator - originally the "escape character" ASCII code - character 27 (decimal) - often written "Esc" on keycaps.

With the introduction of ANSI terminals most escape sequences began with the two characters "ESC" then "[" or a specially-allocated CSI character with a code 155 (decimal).

Not all control sequences used an escape character; for example:
 modem control sequences used by AT/Hayes-compatible modems

 Data General terminal control sequences, but they often were still called escape sequences, and the very common use of "escaping" special characters in programming languages and command-line parameters today often use the "backslash" character to begin the sequence.

Escape sequences in communications are commonly used when a computer and a peripheral have only a single channel through which to send information back and forth (so escape sequences are an example of in-band signaling). They were common when most dumb terminals used ASCII with 7 data bits for communication, and sometimes would be used to switch to a different character set for "foreign" or graphics characters that would otherwise been restricted by the 128 codes available in 7 data bits. Even relatively "dumb" terminals responded to some escape sequences, including the original mechanical Teletype printers (on which "glass Teletypes" or VDUs were based) responded to characters 27 and 31 to alternate between letters and figures modes.

Keyboard
An escape character is usually assigned to the Esc key on a computer keyboard, and can be sent in other ways than as part of an escape sequence.  For example, the Esc key may be used as an input character in editors such as vi, or for backing up one level in a menu in some applications. The Hewlett Packard HP 2640 terminals had a key for a "display functions" mode which would display graphics for all control characters, including Esc, to aid in debugging applications.

If the Esc key and other keys that send escape sequences are both supposed to be meaningful to an application, an ambiguity arises if a character terminal is in use. When the application receives the ASCII escape character, it is not clear whether that character is the result of the user pressing the Esc key or whether it is the initial character of an escape sequence (e.g., resulting from an arrow key press).  The traditional method of resolving the ambiguity is to observe whether or not another character quickly follows the escape character. If not, it is assumed not to be part of an escape sequence. This heuristic can fail under some circumstances, especially without fast modern communication speeds.

Escape sequences date back at least to the 1874 Baudot code.

Modem control
The Hayes command set, for instance, defines a single escape sequence, +++. (In order to interpret +++, which may be a part of data, as the escape sequence, the sender stops communication for one second before and after the +++.) When the modem encounters this in a stream of data, it switches from its normal mode of operation, which simply sends any characters to the phone, to a command mode in which the following data is assumed to be a part of the command language. You can switch back to the online mode by sending the O command.

The Hayes command set is modal, switching from command mode to online mode. This is not appropriate in the case where the commands and data will switch back and forth rapidly. An example of a non-modal escape sequence control language is the VT100, which used a series of commands prefixed by a Control Sequence Introducer.

Comparison with control characters

A control character is a character that, in isolation, has some control function, such as carriage return (CR). Escape sequences, by contrast, consist of one or more escape characters which change the interpretation of subsequent characters.

ASCII video data terminals
The VT52 terminal used simple digraph commands like escape-A: in isolation, "A" simply meant the letter "A", but as part of the escape sequence "escape-A", it had a different meaning. The VT52 also supported parameters: it was not a straightforward control language encoded as substitution.

The later VT100 terminal implemented the more sophisticated ANSI escape sequences standard (now ECMA-48) for functions such as controlling cursor movement, character set, and display enhancements. The Hewlett Packard HP 2640 series had perhaps the most elaborate escape sequences for block and character modes, programming keys and their soft labels, graphics vectors, and even saving data to tape or disk files.

Use in DOS and Windows
A utility, ANSI.SYS, can be used to enable the interpreting of the ANSI (ECMA-48) terminal escape sequences under DOS (by using $e in the PROMPT command) or in command windows in 16-bit Windows.  The rise of GUI applications, which directly write to display cards, has greatly reduced the usage of escape sequences on Microsoft platforms, but they can still be used to create interactive random-access character-based screen interfaces with the character-based library routines such as printf without resorting to a GUI program.

Use in Linux and Unix displays
The default text terminal, and text windows (such as using xterm) respond to ANSI escape sequences.

Quoting escape

Overview
When an escape character is needed within the quoted/escaped string, there are two strategies used within programming and scripting languages:
 doubled delimiter (e.g. 'He didn''t do it.')
 secondary escape sequence

An example of the latter is in the use of the caret (^). E.g. this outputs "You can do so via Cut&Paste" in CMD. (otherwise, the ampersand has a restricted use)

 echo You can do so via Cut^&Paste

In detail

A common use of escape sequences is in fact to remove control characters found in a binary data stream so that they will not cause their control function by mistake. In this case, the control character is replaced by a defined "escape character" (which need not be the US-ASCII escape character) and one or more other characters; after exiting the context where the control character would have caused an action, the sequence is recognized and replaced by the removed character. To transmit the "escape character" itself, two copies are sent.

In many programming languages and command line interfaces escape sequences are used in character literals and string literals, to express characters which are not printable or clash with the syntax of characters or strings. For example, control characters themselves might not be allowed to be placed in the program coded by the editor program, or may have undesirable side-effects if typed into a command. The end-of-quote character is also a problem for programmers that can be solved by escaping it. In most contexts the escape character is the backslash ("\").

Samples
For example, the single quotation mark character might be expressed as '\'' since writing ''' is not acceptable.

Many modern programming languages specify the doublequote character (") as a delimiter for a string literal. The backslash escape character typically provides ways to include doublequotes inside a string literal, such as by modifying the meaning of the doublequote character embedded in the string (\"), or by modifying the meaning of a sequence of characters including the hexadecimal value of a doublequote character (\x22). Both sequences encode a literal doublequote (").

In Perl or Python 2
print "Nancy said "Hello World!" to the crowd.";
produces a syntax error, whereas:
print "Nancy said \"Hello World!\" to the crowd.";  ### example of \"
produces the intended output.
Another alternative:
print "Nancy said \x22Hello World!\x22 to the crowd.";  ### example of \x22
uses "\x" to indicate the following two characters are hexadecimal digits, "22" being the ASCII value for a doublequote in hexadecimal.

C, C++, Java, and Ruby all allow exactly the same two backslash escape styles. The PostScript language and Microsoft Rich Text Format also use backslash escapes. The quoted-printable encoding uses the equals sign as an escape character.

URL and URI use percent-encoding to quote characters with a special meaning, as for non-ASCII characters.

Another similar (and partially overlapping) syntactic trick is stropping.

Some programming languages also provide other ways to represent special characters in literals, without requiring an escape character (see e.g. delimiter collision).

See also
 Control character
 Escape character
 printf format string
 format control string

References

Control characters